Suniana sunias is a butterfly of the family Hesperiidae. It is found in Indonesia (Papua, Maluku), Australia (New South Wales, Northern Territory and Queensland), Papua New Guinea and the Solomon Islands.

The wingspan is about 25 mm.

The larvae feed on Sorghum verticilliflorum, Paspalum urvillei, Panicum maximum, Leersia hexandra and other Leersia species. They rest in a shelter made from blades of their host plant joined with silk.

Subspecies
Suniana sunias sunias (Indonesia) - wide-brand grass-dart
Suniana sunias rectivitta (Mabille, 1878)  (New South Wales, Queensland)
Suniana sunias sauda Waterhouse, 1937 (Northern Territory) - orange dart
Suniana sunias tanus  (Plötz, 1885)  (New Guinea)
Suniana sunias nihana (Fruhstorfer, 1910)

External links
Australian Insects
Australian Faunal Directory

Hesperiinae
Butterflies described in 1860